Clomegestone acetate (developmental code name SH-741), or clomagestone acetate, also known as 6-chloro-17α-acetoxy-16α-methylpregna-4,6-diene-3,20-dione, is a steroidal progestin of the 17α-hydroxyprogesterone group which was developed as an oral contraceptive but was never marketed. It is the acetate ester of clomegestone, which, similarly to clomegestone acetate, was never marketed. Clomegestone acetate is also the 17-desoxy cogener of clometherone, and is somewhat more potent in comparison. Similarly to cyproterone acetate, clomegestone acetate has been found to alter insulin receptor concentrations in adipose tissue, and this may indicate the presence of glucocorticoid activity.

References 

Abandoned drugs
Acetate esters
Organochlorides
Pregnanes
Progestogen esters
Progestogens